The Quake is a 2018 Norwegian disaster film directed by John Andreas Andersen. It is the sequel to The Wave and was released in Norwegian theaters on 31 August 2018.

Plot
In 2016, geologist Kristian Eikjord is hailed a hero for his actions during the tsunami in Geiranger. Three years later, his wife Idun is divorcing him and he is separated from his children, Sondre and Julia. Kristian lives in seclusion high above the mostly-rebuilt Geiranger, while his family moves to Oslo, where Idun works at the Radisson Blu Plaza Hotel. Kristian feels responsible for the 250 fatalities of the tsunami and keeps a secret room in his house dedicated to the events and the fatalities, which causes strain with his family.

Kristian learns of the death of fellow geologist Konrad Lindblom in a collapse in the Oslofjord Tunnel, and travels to Oslo with Konrad's research to investigate the circumstances of his death. He meets with Konrad's supervisor, Johannes Løberg, whose organization maintains a seismic activity monitoring system. Johannes reassures Kristian that the seismic activity that Konrad was worried about was merely construction blasting being done across the city and that there is nothing to be concerned about, but Kristian doubts his claims. Kristian visits Konrad's house, where he meets Konrad's daughter Marit and discovers Konrad's research, including core samples and a map that has recorded more serious seismic activity than Johannes claimed. He calls Johannes about this, but Johannes mostly ignores him.

Kristian visits Idun, meets with Sondre and his new girlfriend, and is invited to Julia's ballet recital. As Kristian and Idun discuss their separation, the power goes out for the second time that week. The next day, Kristian finds more concerning research in Konrad's house, and convinces Marit to take him to the Oslofjord Tunnel, where he discovers a core sample Konrad was attempting to recover shortly before his death. While traveling back to Oslo, Kristian accidentally snaps the core sample, and realizes that the earth underneath Oslo is unusually weak. Suddenly, a seismic rift destroys the Oslo Opera House where Julia is doing her recital; Idun safely gets Julia out of the building. When Johannes and his team arrive to inspect the damage, Kristian confronts him, but Johannes claims the collapse occurred due to the opera house's deteriorating support beams. That night, Kristian visits Idun to apologize for missing the recital and breaks down, explaining he is constantly looking for the next disaster. They embrace as Kristian cries, and the couple spends the night together.

The next morning, when Idun leaves for work and Sondre goes to University of Oslo, Marit discovers a video on her father's computer and shows it to Kristian. The video shows that Konrad was using rats to investigate his theories, and that those rats had died from exposure to toxic gas; Kristian concludes that a major earthquake, up to 8.5 on the Richter scale, will strike Oslo, and that the collapse that killed Konrad was merely an omen. Kristian, Marit, and Julia rush to the Radisson Blu to warn Idun. On the way, Kristian calls Sondre to warn him, but Sondre, who is in class, ignores his calls. Kristian tries to call in a fake bomb threat to evacuate the university, but Sondre is convinced that they must leave the building after the evacuation alarm goes off.

Arriving at the hotel, Kristian finds Idun on the 34th floor, convinces her to go downstairs with him, and pulls the fire alarm to get everyone else to evacuate. Julia wanders into the building to find her father, with Marit in pursuit. Getting on an elevator with Idun, Kristian sees Julia on the other end of the room, but the elevator door closes before he can  the mounted bar, and she saves Julia from meeting the hotel worker's fate.

Meanwhile, after coming to, Kristian and Idun make their way out of the stuck elevator and climb maintenance ladders to get to the top floor of the elevator shaft. Debris knocked loose by aftershocks fall down the shaft and mutilate Idun's leg, forcing Kristian to carry her. They arrive at an open elevator door near the 30th story and attempt to use a severed elevator cord to swing across to the opening. Kristian succeeds, but an injured and weakened Idun falls to her death after the power goes out and the brakes on the elevator above fail. Devastated, Kristian heads to the place where he last saw Julia and finds her and Marit huddling behind the mounted bar. As they are attempting to leave, a final aftershock causes Julia to lose her grip, and she slides down the floor; Kristian jumps after her and pushes her out of the way, but knocks himself out in the process. When he comes to, he finds Julia on a cracking window. Kristian and Marit manage to rescue Julia before the window breaks, and they escape the hotel.

After the earthquake, Marit enters Konrad's office to find it mostly destroyed, except for a picture of her as a child with her father. Kristian, Julia, and Sondre, now reunited, arrive at their old home in Geiranger by ferry. Descriptions at the end explain that Norway has the most seismic activity north of the Alps, and that a major earthquake is expected to hit Norway in the coming future, but it is unknown when it will hit.

Cast
 Kristoffer Joner as Kristian Eikjord, a 44-year old experienced geologist
 Ane Dahl Torp as Idun Eikjord, Kristian's wife
 Jonas Hoff Oftebro as Sondre Eikjord, Kristian's 20-year-old son
 Edith Haagenrud-Sande as Julia Eikjord, Kristian's 11-year-old daughter
 Kathrine Thorborg Johansen as Marit Lindblom

Response

Box office
The Quake grossed $6,235 in the United States and Canada and $14 million in other territories for a worldwide total of $14 million, plus $374,237 with home video sales.

Critical reception
The website's critical consensus reads, "A satisfyingly smart action thriller, The Quake delivers plenty of nail-biting tension without sacrificing character development or common sense." On Metacritic, the film holds a rating of 70 out of 100, based on 11 critics, indicating "generally favorable reviews".

At the 2019 Amanda Awards, the film received The People’s Amanda and the award for Best Visual Effects. In addition, the film was also nominated in the categories of Best Norwegian Film in Theatrical Release and Best Production Direction/Scenography.

References

External links
 
  (Magnet Releasing)
 
 
The Quake on Rotten Tomatoes

2018 films
2010s disaster films
Films about earthquakes
Films set in Norway
Norwegian disaster films
Norwegian sequel films
Oslofjord